Daniel Harry Friedan (born October 3, 1948) is an American theoretical physicist and one of three children of the feminist author and activist Betty Friedan. He is a professor at Rutgers University.

Biography

Education and career
Friedan earned his Ph.D. from the University of California, Berkeley in 1980 and was named a MacArthur Fellow in 1987.

In 1979, he showed that the equations of motions of string theory, which are generalizations of the Einstein equations of general relativity, emerge from the renormalization group equations for the two-dimensional field theory.

Friedan has worked in string theory and condensed matter theory, specializing in (1 + 1)-dimensional systems. His current research focuses on applications to quantum computers.

Friedan received the 2010 Lars Onsager Prize from the American Physical Society "for seminal work on the classification and characterization of two-dimensional unitary conformal field theories of critical states." He teaches at Rutgers University currently.

Personal life
Daniel is married to an Icelandic physics teacher, Ragnheiður Guðmundsdóttir. They have two daughters and one son together.

References

External links
 Daniel Friedan's homepage, Rutgers University

1948 births
Living people
21st-century American physicists
Jewish American scientists
MacArthur Fellows
American string theorists
Fellows of the American Physical Society
University of California, Berkeley alumni
21st-century American Jews